Protestantism is a minority religion in the United Arab Emirates. Among the Protestant denominations in the country are the Christian Brethren, the Coptic Evangelical Church, the Evangelical Alliance Church, and the Seventh-day Adventists. Adventists have officially operated in the UAE since 1988. Other denominations are the Arab Evangelical Church of Dubai, Dubai City Church and the United Christian Church of Dubai. The Anglican Communion is represented by the Diocese of Cyprus and the Gulf of the Episcopal Church in Jerusalem and the Middle East. The government does not permit churches to display crosses on the outside of their premises or to erect bell towers. Christian men are not allowed to marry Muslim women. The government does not permit conversion from Islam. Non-Muslim religious leaders reported that customs authorities rarely questioned the entry of religious materials such as Bibles and hymnals into the country. On December 25, 2007, the President's Religious Affairs Advisor al-Hashemi participated in Anglican Church celebrations of Christmas.

References

See also 
Roman Catholicism in the United Arab Emirates
Freedom of religion in the United Arab Emirates

 
United Arab Emirates